Hematology (always spelled haematology in British English) is the branch of medicine concerned with the study of the cause, prognosis, treatment, and prevention of diseases related to blood. It involves treating diseases that affect the production of blood and its components, such as blood cells, hemoglobin, blood proteins, bone marrow, platelets, blood vessels, spleen, and the mechanism of coagulation. Such diseases might include hemophilia, sickle cell anemia, blood clots (thrombus), other bleeding disorders, and blood cancers such as leukemia, multiple myeloma, and lymphoma. The laboratory analysis of blood is frequently performed by a medical technologist or medical laboratory scientist.

Specialization
Physicians specialized in hematology are  known as hematologists or haematologists. Their routine work mainly includes the care and treatment of patients with hematological diseases, although some may also work at the hematology laboratory viewing blood films and bone marrow slides under the microscope, interpreting various hematological test results and blood clotting test results. In some institutions, hematologists also manage the hematology laboratory. Physicians who work in hematology laboratories, and most commonly manage them, are pathologists specialized in the diagnosis of hematological diseases, referred to as hematopathologists or haematopathologists. Hematologists and hematopathologists generally work in conjunction to formulate a diagnosis and deliver the most appropriate therapy if needed. Hematology is a distinct subspecialty of internal medicine, separate from but overlapping with the subspecialty of medical oncology. Hematologists may specialize further or have special interests, for example, in:
 treating bleeding disorders such as hemophilia and idiopathic thrombocytopenic purpura
 treating hematological malignancies such as lymphoma and leukemia (cancers)
 treating hemoglobinopathies
 the science of blood transfusion and the work of a blood bank
 bone marrow and stem cell transplantation

Training
Starting hematologists (in the US) complete a four-year medical degree followed by three or four more years in residency or internship programs. After completion, they further expand their knowledge by spending two or three more years learning how to experiment, diagnose, and treat blood disorders. When applying for this career, most job openings look for first-hand practical experience in a recognized training program that provides practice in the following: Cause of abnormalities in formation of blood and other disorders, diagnosis of numerous blood related conditions or cancers using experimentation, and the proper care and treatment of patients in the best manner. There are two parts in training of hematology; one is clinical hematology and another is hematopathology.

See also
 Hematopathology

References 

 
Blood